The Hemiscylliidae are a family of sharks in the order Orectolobiformes, commonly known as  longtail carpet sharks and sometimes  as bamboo sharks. They are found in shallow waters of the tropical Indo-Pacific.

They have elongated, cylindrical bodies, with short barbels and large spiracles. As their common name suggests, they have unusually long tails, which exceed the length of the rest of their bodies. They are sluggish fish, feeding on bottom-dwelling invertebrates and smaller fish.

Genera and species

Chiloscyllium
This genus is distinguished by a relatively long snout with subterminal nostrils. The eyes and supraorbital ridges are hardly elevated. The mouth is closer to the eyes than to the tip of the snout, with lower labial folds usually connected across the chin by a flap of skin. The pectoral and pelvic fins are thin and not very muscular. No black hood  on the head or large black spot on the side is present (though juveniles often are strongly marked with dark spots/bars).

 Chiloscyllium arabicum Gubanov, 1980 (Arabian carpetshark)
 Chiloscyllium burmensis Dingerkus & DeFino, 1983 (Burmese bamboo shark)
 Chiloscyllium griseum J. P. Müller & Henle, 1838 (grey bamboo shark)
 Chiloscyllium hasselti Bleeker, 1852 (Hasselt's bamboo shark)
 Chiloscyllium indicum (J. F. Gmelin, 1789) (slender bamboo shark)
 Chiloscyllium plagiosum (Anonymous, referred to Bennett, 1830) (white-spotted bamboo shark)
 Chiloscyllium punctatum J. P. Müller & Henle, 1838 (brown-banded bamboo shark)

Hemiscyllium

This genus is confined to tropical waters of Australia, Papua New Guinea, and Indonesia, but an individual from this genus, possibly representing an undescribed species, has been photographed at the Seychelles. They have short snouts with the nostrils placed almost at the tip, and well-elevated eyes and supraorbital ridges. The mouth is closer to the tip of the snout than the eyes, and lacks the connecting dermal fold across the chin. The pectoral and pelvic fins are thick and heavily muscular. Either a black hood on the head or a large black spot on the sides of the body is present.

Nine recognized species are in this genus:
 Hemiscyllium freycineti (Quoy & Gaimard, 1824) (Indonesian speckled carpetshark)
 Hemiscyllium galei G. R. Allen & Erdmann, 2008 (Cenderwasih epaulette shark)
 Hemiscyllium hallstromi Whitley, 1967 (Papuan epaulette shark)
 Hemiscyllium halmahera G. R. Allen, Erdmann & Dudgeon, 2013 (Halmahera epaulette shark)
 Hemiscyllium henryi G. R. Allen & Erdmann, 2008 (Henry's epaulette shark)
 Hemiscyllium michaeli G. R. Allen & Dudgeon, 2010 (Milne Bay epaulette shark)
 Hemiscyllium ocellatum (Bonnaterre, 1788) (epaulette shark)
 Hemiscyllium strahani Whitley, 1967 (hooded carpetshark)
 Hemiscyllium trispeculare J. Richardson, 1843 (speckled carpetshark)
 Hemiscyllium sp. Not yet described (Seychelles carpetshark)

Fossil taxa

 †Acanthoscyllium sahelalmae (Pictet & Humbert, 1866)
 †Adnetoscyllium angloparisensis (Guinot et al, 2013)
 †Almascyllium cheikeliasi (Signeaux, 1949)
 †Chiloscyllium broenirnani Casier, 1958
 †Hemiscyllium bruxelliensis Herman, 1977
 †Mesiteia daimeriesi (Herman, 1973)
 †Pseudospinax heterodon Underwood & Mitchell, 1999

Captivity
Hemiscylliid sharks are sometimes kept in home aquaria. Species from this family are ideal aquarium sharks because their natural habitats are tidepools, coral beds, and around boulders. This predisposition towards relatively confined spaces helps them adapt better to home aquaria compared to other species. Their generally small size for sharks, and their preference for water temperatures comparable to those enjoyed by other common aquarium fish, have also endeared them to marine aquarists. Multiple species of hemiscylliids have been successfully induced to breed in captivity.

Full-sized adult epaulette sharks are most successfully housed in tanks at or exceeding , while adult bamboo sharks require more space and are known to do well in  aquaria. Hemiscyliids in captivity are provided artificial caves in which to hide. However, unstable tank decor has been known to cause fatal injuries when the structure is disturbed by the sharks' digging behavior.

Parthenogenesis
The British press on February 10, 2016 reported that a bamboo shark at Great Yarmouth’s Sea Life Centre was pregnant with two fertilized eggs. It is known that the shark has not come into contact with any other bamboo sharks since 2013. Although parthenogenesis is observed in a small number of species, this is such a rare occurrence in this species that it became a news story.

References

 
Orectolobiformes
Taxa named by Theodore Gill
Shark families
Extant Late Jurassic first appearances